Mohammed Taha (born 2 November 1993) is an Indian cricketer. He made his Twenty20 debut for Karnataka in the 2015–16 Syed Mushtaq Ali Trophy on 2 January 2016.

References

External links
 

1993 births
Living people
Indian cricketers
Karnataka cricketers
Cricketers from Bangalore